"War Is All We Know" is the second track in GWAR's 2006 album Beyond Hell and can be considered the first actual song in the album as the previous track was merely an introduction designed to build up tension for this track. This track puts emphasis on the thrash metal style GWAR had been developing for about 5 years previous to Beyond Hell and features fast-paced riffing by Balsac the Jaws of Death and Flattus Maximus as well as barked vocals by Oderus Urungus. The song, however, breaks in the middle into a slow, heavily distorted, dissonant interlude in which the drums by Jizmak Da Gusha become most notable. The song then speeds up again and returns to a similar riff as the one present at the start of the song before ending and leading into the following track.

Relevance to Beyond Hell's plot
The album's Intro sets the context for this track, as it tells you of GWAR sleeping through "half the war". This song on the other hand, tells us of said war as GWAR are attacked by the armies of the Nazi Pope and find themselves defending their fortress from the enemy's incoming attack. However, despite their attempts at resistance, GWAR are forced to retreat after their fortress is nuked by the enemy.

References

Gwar songs
2006 songs